This list of Massachusetts Institute of Technology alumni includes students who studied as undergraduates or graduate students at MIT's School of Engineering; School of Science; MIT Sloan School of Management; School of Humanities, Arts, and Social Sciences; School of Architecture and Planning; or Whitaker College of Health Sciences. Since there are more than 120,000 alumni (living and deceased), this listing cannot be comprehensive. Instead, this article summarizes some of the more notable MIT alumni, with some indication of the reasons they are notable in the world at large. All MIT degrees are earned through academic achievement, in that MIT has never awarded honorary degrees in any form.

The MIT Alumni Association defines eligibility for membership as follows:
The following persons are Alumni/ae Members of the Association:

All persons who have received a degree from the Institute; and
All persons who have been registered as students in a degree-granting program at the Institute for (i) at least one full term in any undergraduate class which has already graduated; or (ii) for at least two full terms as graduate students.

As a celebration of the new MIT building dedicated to nanotechnology laboratories in 2018, a special silicon wafer was designed and fabricated with an image of the Great Dome. This One.MIT image is composed of more than 270,000 individual names, comprising all the students, faculty, and staff at MIT during the years 1861–2018. A special website was set up to document the creation of a large wall display in the building, and to facilitate the location of individual names in the image.

Politics and public service

United States

International

Architecture and design

Christopher Charles Benninger (MCP 1971) – award-winning architect and urban planner in India, Sri Lanka, prepared capital plan of Bhutan
Walter Danforth Bliss – architect from California, with many buildings on the National Register of Historic Places
Gordon Bunshaft (BArch 1933, MArch 1935) – architect of Lever House (New York City), Beinecke Library (Yale), Hirshhorn Museum and Sculpture Garden (Washington DC); Pritzker Prize (1988)
Ogden Codman, Jr. (1884) – Beaux-Arts domestic architect, interior designer
Vishaan Chakrabarti (MCP 1993)— architect and dean of UC Berkeley's College of Environmental Design
John Desmond (MArch) – designed numerous public buildings in Baton Rouge, including the River Center

Daniel Chester French (1871, one year) – sculptor of Abraham Lincoln (Lincoln Memorial), John Harvard (Harvard Yard), Minute Man (Concord, Massachusetts)
Cass Gilbert (1880) – architect of the US Supreme Court Building, Woolworth Building (New York City)
Charles Sumner Greene (1891) – partner in Greene and Greene, domestic architects of Arts & Crafts style, Gamble House (Pasadena)
Henry Mather Greene (1891) – partner in Greene and Greene, domestic architects of Arts & Crafts style, Gamble House (Pasadena)
Marion Mahony Griffin (1894) – co-designer of the master plan for Canberra, Australia
Nathanael Herreshoff (B.S. 1870) – naval architect-engineer, yacht designer
Raymond Hood (1903) – architect of Rockefeller Center (New York City), Tribune Tower (Chicago)
Lois Lilley Howe (B.S. 1890) – second woman in the US to found an architecture firm
Jarvis Hunt – Chicago architect
Myron Hunt (B.S. 1893) – architect of Huntington Art Gallery, Rose Bowl (Pasadena)
Piotr Kowalski (B.S. 1952) – artist, sculptor, architect, professor
Roger K. Lewis (BArch 1964; MArch 1967) – architect, urban planner, professor, author
Austin W. Lord (1888) – architect of the administration buildings, Isthmian Canal Commission, Panama; director of the School of Architecture at Columbia University
Kevin A. Lynch (B.S. 1947) – urban planner, author of the seminal book The Image of the City
John O. Merrill (B.S. 1921) – structural engineer, architect, leader of Skidmore, Owings and Merrill
Eleanor Manning O'Connor (B.S. 1906) – architect, educator, public housing advocate
I. M. Pei (BArch 1940) – architect, Louvre Pyramid (Paris), Rock and Roll Hall of Fame (Cleveland), Bank of China (Hong Kong), MIT Buildings 18, 54, 66, E15; AIA Gold Medal (1979), Pritzker Prize (1983)
Donald W. Southgate (1887–1953) – architect in Nashville, Tennessee
Sumner Spaulding (1892–1952) – architect, graduated in 1916, designed many buildings in California
Louis Sullivan (one year) – influential founder of the Chicago School; "father of skyscrapers"; "father of modernism"; AIA Gold Medal (1944)
James Knox Taylor (1880) – Supervisory Architect of Denver Mint, Philadelphia Mint, many post offices, court houses, other federal buildings
Robert Taylor (1892) – MIT's first black graduate, architect of the Tuskegee Institute
Harry Mohr Weese (BArch 1938) – architect, historic preservation advocate, designed first group of stations for Washington Metro system

Business and entrepreneurship
See also List of companies founded by Massachusetts Institute of Technology alumni

Computers and Internet

Brandon Wade (B.S. 1993) – founder of Seeking Arrangement 
Joseph Alsop (B.S. 1967) – co-founder of Progress Software
Efi Arazi – Israeli industrialist and businessman, founder of Scitex Corporation
Shiva Ayyadurai (B.S. 1987, M.S. 1989, M.S. 1990, PhD 2007) – scientist and inventor
Sanju Bansal – co-founder of MicroStrategy
Hugo Barra – VP Global for Xiaomi, former VP and product spokesman for Google Android
Katie Bouman (PhD 2017) – developer of the algorithm used in filtering the first images of a black hole taken by the Event Horizon Telescope
Anant Bhardwaj (Ph.D. dropout) – founder of Instabase
Larry DeMar (B.S. 1979) – programmer for Williams, co-creator of Defender and Robotron: 2084, and founder of Leading Edge Design
Matt Denesuk (B.S. 1987) – SVP, Data Analytics & AI at Royal Caribbean Group; founder of Noodle.ai, Chief Data Science Officer of GE.
John J. Donovan (Postdoc 1969) – founder of Cambridge Technology Partners, and Open Environment Corporation
Eran Egozy – co-founder, CTO, and VP of Harmonix Systems; now clarinetist and professor of music at MIT
Arash Ferdowsi (dropped out) – co-founder and CTO at Dropbox
Carly Fiorina (M.S. 1989) – former CEO of Hewlett-Packard
 Philip Gale (1978–1998) – writer of TotalAccess, computer prodigy, and Internet software developer
Andy Gavin – co-founder of Naughty Dog and creator of the first video game with a full 3D environment, Crash Bandicoot
Shuman Ghosemajumder – author of Open Music Model, click fraud czar at Google
Cecil H. Green (B.S. 1924, M.S. 1924) – co-founder of Texas Instruments
Andrew He (B.S. 2019)  – competitive programmer
William R. Hewlett (M.S. 1936) – co-founder of Hewlett-Packard
Danny Hillis (B.S. 1978, M.S. 1981, PhD 1988) – co-founder of Thinking Machines and former Disney Fellow
Mark Horowitz (B.S. 1978, M.S. 1978) – founder of Rambus
Drew Houston (B.S. 2006) – co-founder and CEO of Dropbox
Irwin M. Jacobs (M.S. 1957, ScD 1959) – co-founder of Qualcomm with Andrew Viterbi, current chairman and former CEO; former MIT professor (1959–1966)
Brewster Kahle (B.S. 1982) – internet archivist, founder of Alexa
Mitch Kapor – software entrepreneur, founder of Lotus Corporation
Earl Killian – software architect with 26 patents, MIPS
Steve Kirsch (B.S. 1980, M.S. 1980) – inventor of the optical mouse, co-founder of Frame Technology Corporation and founder of Infoseek Corporation
Alan Kotok (B.S. 1962, M.S. 1962) – chief architect PDP-10, associate chairman World Wide Web Consortium
Pavel Krapivin (B.S. 2002) – co-founder of Doostang
Susan Landau (PhD 1983) – Guggenheim Fellow and cybersecurity expert
Daniel Lewin (M.S. 1998) – founder of Akamai
Jack Little (B.S. 1978) – co-founder of MathWorks, which created and sells MATLAB
Sonita Lontoh (M.Eng 2004) – green technology executive
Steve Mann – co-creator of the SixthSense device
Patrick McGovern (B.S. 1960) – founder of IDG/Computerworld
Steve Meretzky (B.S. 1979) – computer game designer
Robert Metcalfe (B.S. 1969) – entrepreneur, founder of 3Com; inventor of Ethernet
Pranav Mistry (PhD) – co-creator of the SixthSense device
Nicholas Negroponte (B.Arch, M.Arch 1966) – founder, MIT Media Lab, One Laptop per Child Association
Kathy Nelson (B.S. – Electrical Engineering 1993) – creator of world's first holographic video game
Robert Noyce (PhD 1953) – integrated circuit pioneer, co-founder of Intel, Draper Prize (1969)
Ken Olsen (B.S. 1950, M.S. 1952) – founder of Digital Equipment Corporation
William Poduska (B.S. 1960, M.S. 1960, ScD 1962) – computer engineer and entrepreneur, founder of Prime Computer and Apollo Computer
William A. Porter (MBA 1967) – founder of E*TRADE
Allen Razdow (B.S. 1976) – founder of Mathsoft Inc.; inventor of Mathcad
Alex Rigopulos (B.S. 1994, M.S. 1994) – founder of Harmonix Music Systems, developer of Guitar Hero and Rock Band
Larry Roberts (B.S. 1961, M.S. 1961, PhD 1963) – member of design group for original ARPANET, co-founder of Caspian Networks and Packetcom, former CEO of DHL
Sheldon Roberts (M.S. 1949, ScD 1952) – one of the "traitorous eight" who founded Fairchild Semiconductor; co-founder of Amelco which later became Teledyne
Douglas T. Ross (M.S. 1954) – founder of SofTech, Inc.
Michael J. Saylor (B.S. Astronautics 1987, B.S. Science, Engineering, Technology 1987) – co-founder of MicroStrategy
Megan Smith (B.S. 1986, M.S. 1988) – Google executive; former CEO of PlanetOut, early smartphones at General Magic, 3rd United States Chief Technology Officer (2014–17) 
Robert Spinrad (PhD) – computer pioneer; director of the Xerox Palo Alto Research Center
Ray Stata (B.S. 1958, M.S. 1958) – founder of Analog Devices
Lisa Su (B.S. 1990, M.S. 1991, PhD 1994) – CEO of Advanced Micro Devices
Eric Swanson – co-founder of Sycamore Networks
Theodore Tso – Google software engineer, maintainer of the ext4 filesystem
Philippe Villers (M.S. 1960) – founder of Computervision, which is now part of PTC
Andrew Viterbi (B.S. 1957, M.S. 1957) – electrical engineer; inventor of the Viterbi algorithm; co-founder of Qualcomm; former UCLA and UCSD professor
Christopher Weaver (M.S. 1985) – founder of Bethesda Softworks and co-founder of ZeniMax Media

Engineering

Colin Angle – co-founder of iRobot
Satya N. Atluri (Sc.D Aeronautics & Astronautics, 1969) – engineer; recipient of 2013 Padma Bhushan 2013, 2015 Crichlow Trust Prize from AIAA
Karel Bossart (M.S. 1927) – designer of the SM-65 Atlas missile
Vanu Bose – electrical engineer, founder of Vanu Inc, and son of Amar Bose
William David Coolidge (B.S. 1896) – physicist who made major contributions to X-ray machines, director of the General Electric Research Laboratory
Henry M. Crane (B.S. 1895 and 1896) – automotive engineer associated with Crane Motor Car Company, Crane-Simplex, Pontiac Six, and Wright-Martin
Charles Stark Draper (B.S. 1926, M.S. 1928, SD 1938) – engineer and inventor; the "father of inertial navigation"; inducted into the National Inventors Hall of Fame in 1981
Helen Greiner – co-founder of iRobot
Charles Townsend Ludington – aviation pioneer
Francis "Des" Lynch (ScD Mechanical Engineering 1968) - Patented several inventions including the ideal dimple patterns for Titleist golf balls
Ernest Boyd MacNaughton (B.S. 1902) – bank president; president of The Oregonian; president of Reed College
Fred Mannering (PhD 1983) – professor University of South Florida; Clarivate Highly Cited Researcher
Jim Marggraff (B.S. Electrical Engineering, M.S. Computer Science) – inventor of the LeapPad Learning System, Fly pentop computer, and Livescribe smartpen
Lissa Martinez (M.S. 1980) – ocean engineer
Mohammad Modarres – Eminent Professor of the University of Maryland; founder of world's first graduate curriculum in reliability engineering
Henry M. Paynter (B.S. civil engineering 1944, M.S. mathematics and science 1949, ScD hydroelectric engineering 1951, all MIT) – inventor of bond graphs
Nicholas A. Peppas – professor of engineering, University of Texas at Austin, pioneer in drug delivery, biomaterials, hydrogels and nanobiotechnology
Thuan Pham (B.S. Computer Science & Engineering 1990, M.S. 1991) – CTO of Uber
RJ Scaringe (M.S., PhD) – CEO of Rivian, Plymouth, Michigan, United States
Tom Scholz – founder of the rock group Boston and Scholz Research & Development, Inc., manufacturers of Rockman sound equipment
Dorian Shainin (B.S. 1936) – quality paradigm pioneer and guru; considered one of the world's foremost experts in the fields of industrial problem solving, product reliability and quality engineering; known for the creation and development of the "Red X" concept
Mareena Robinson Snowden – first Black woman to earn a Ph.D. in nuclear engineering
Suhas Pandurang Sukhatme – former Chairman of Atomic Energy Regulatory Board of India
 Suchatvee Suwansawat, (M.S. Policy and Technology, Sc.D Geotechnical Engineering 2002)Thai Politicians, Professor of Engineering, former President of King Mongkut's Institute of Technology Ladkrabang (KMITL), former of President of the Thai Council of Engineers
Christine Taylor-Butler (civil engineering 1981) – children's author

Manufacturing and defense

Vaughn Beals – CEO of Harley-Davidson
Amar Bose – founder and chairman of Bose Corporation
Wesley G. Bush – chairman, CEO and President of Northrop Grumman
Morris Chang – chairman of the Taiwan Semiconductor Manufacturing Company (TSMC), the largest semiconductor foundry in the world
Nick DeWolf – co-founder of Teradyne
John Dorrance – founder of Campbell Soup Company
Donald Douglas – founder of Douglas Aircraft Company
Pierre S. du Pont – Du Pont Company and General Motors executive
T. Coleman du Pont – Du Pont Company president; US Senator
Armand V. Feigenbaum – quality expert
William Clay Ford, Jr. – chairman of Ford Motor Company
Bernardo Garza Sada – founder and president of the ALFA conglomerate of Mexico
Kenneth Germeshausen – co-founder, and the first "G", of the defense contractor EG&G
Bernard Marshall Gordon (B.S. 1949, M.S. 1949) – electrical engineer, inventor, philanthropist, co-founded Analogic Corporation, National Medal of Technology (1986)
George Hatsopoulos – founder of Thermo Electron Corporation
Charles Koch – co-owner, Chairman and CEO of Koch Industries, the second largest private company in the US
David H. Koch – co-owner of Koch Industries; Vice-Presidential candidate for the Libertarian Party
Jay Last – one of the "traitorous eight" who founded Fairchild Semiconductor; co-founder of Amelco, which became Teledyne
James McDonnell – co-founder of McDonnell Douglas
Alan Mulally – president and CEO of Ford Motor Company
William Emery Nickerson – co-founder of Gillette, now part of Procter & Gamble
Willard Rockwell – founder of Rockwell International
Pablo Rodriguez Cordoves – CEO of Hermasa Canning Technology
Henry Singleton – founder of Teledyne
Alfred P. Sloan, Jr. – automobile entrepreneur, former CEO of General Motors
Wong Tsu – first engineer of the Boeing Company
Uncas Whitaker – founder of AMP Incorporated (now a division of Tyco International)
Rick Woodward – president of Woodward Iron Company, owner of Birmingham Barons

Finance and consulting

Roger Ward Babson – entrepreneur, founder of Babson Institute (now Babson College), 1940 presidential nominee on the Prohibition Party ticket
Michael Brennan – pioneering finance academic, former president of the American Finance Association
Sam Bankman-Fried (B.S. 2014) - Founder and former CEO of the insolvent cryptocurrency exchange FTX and quantitative cryptocurrency trading firm Alameda Research
Richard Carrión – CEO of Banco Popular de Puerto Rico, and of Popular, Inc.
Wesley Chan – investment partner at Google Ventures
Lisa Endlich – business author, former vice-president at Goldman Sachs
Mark Gorenberg – partner of the venture capital firm Hummer Winblad Venture Partners
Robert C. Hancké – Belgian economist
Michael Hammer – pioneer of Business Process Reengineering, founder of Hammer and Co.
Mansoor Ijaz – founder and chairman of Crescent Investment Management Ltd; developer of the CARAT trading system
Shantanurao Laxmanrao Kirloskar – founder of Kirloskar Group
Arthur Dehon Little – entrepreneur, founder of the eponymous management consulting firm Arthur D. Little in 1886
Mark Mobius – emerging markets investor and fund manager
Kenichi Ohmae – former director of the Japan arm of McKinsey & Company, management consultants
Tom Perkins – founder of venture capital firm Kleiner, Perkins, Caufield & Byers
John S. Reed – chairman of the New York Stock Exchange
Ed Seykota – commodity trader
Jim Simons – mathematician; philanthropist; founder of Renaissance Technologies hedge fund
John Thain – former CEO of Merrill Lynch, former Chief Executive Officer of the New York Stock Exchange
William Toy – director at CDC, New York and Goldman Sachs; developer of the Black–Derman–Toy interest rate model
C. S. Venkatakrishnan – CEO of Barclays.
Nigel Wilson – CEO of Legal & General

Health care and biotechnology

David Benaron – digital health entrepreneur, physician
George A. Herzlinger (B.S., PhD physics) – medical innovation entrepreneur who invented and, with Regina, founded firms that built and sold an intra aortic balloon pump and a standard-of-care rapid infuser that have saved thousands of lives
Regina E. Herzlinger (B.S. economics) – First woman to be tenured and chaired at HBS and to serve on large corporate health care Boards of Directors, including John Deere and Cardinal Health; author of three best-selling health care trade books. Known as the "Godmother of Consumer-Driven health care."
Paul F. Levy (SB, MCP 1974) – former president of Beth Israel Deaconess Medical Center hospitals, former Executive Director of Boston's MWRA Harbor Cleanup project
Bernard Sherman (PhD astrophysics) – Canadian billionaire, philanthropist, and founder of Apotex
Robert A. Swanson – co-founder of Genentech
Ron Williams – CEO of Aetna

Miscellaneous

David A. Aaker – consultant and author of Marketing
Aditya Birla – industrialist, deceased son of basant Kumar Birla and father of Kumar Mangalam who heads Aditya Birla Group
Joseph Chung – co-founder of Art Technology Group with fellow MIT grad Jeet Singh
Jack Crichton – oil and natural gas industrialist from Texas; Republican candidate for governor in 1964
Samuel Face – inventor and co-developer of advances in concrete and piezoelectric technologies
Victor Kwok-king Fung – prominent Hong Kong billionaire businessman and political figure
Antonio Galloni – Wine critic and founder of Vinous
Eugenio Garza Sada – Mexican businessman, philanthropist and founder of the Tec de Monterrey
Krisztina "Z" Holly (B.S. 1989, M.S. 1992) - co-founder of Stylus Innovation, curator of first TEDx, founder of MIT Deshpande Center for Technological Innovation, former vice provost for innovation at University of Southern California
John Legere – CEO of T-Mobile, post-graduate school, received M.S. from MIT 
Nikolaos Mavridis – founder of the Interactive Robots and Media Lab
David McGrath – founder of TAD Resources, now part of Adecco
Dana G. Mead – former CEO and chair of Tenneco
Hamid R. Moghadam – co-founder, chairman and CEO of Prologis
Stewart Nelson – founder of Systems Concepts
Eric P. Newman – numismatist 
Arthur S. Obermayer – founder of the Moleculon Research Corporation; philanthropist
John Ofori-Tenkorang – Director General of the Social Security and National Insurance Trust (SSNIT), Ghana
Generoso Pope – founder and owner of The National Enquirer
Alexander N. Rossolimo – founding chairman of Center for Security and Social Progress
Michael J. Saylor – founder of MicroStrategy
Alan Spoon (B.S. 1973) – former president of The Washington Post Company
Leelila Strogov – general assignment reporter for Fox 11 News
Richard Tomlinson – British intelligence officer
Helmut Weymar – founder of Commodities Corporation

Education

Theodosios Alexander (M.S. in Naval Architecture and Marine Engineering 1982; M.S. in Ocean Systems Management; M.S. in Mechanical Engineering; ScD in Mechanical Engineering 1987) – Dean of Parks College of Engineering, Aviation and Technology of Saint Louis University; Professor and Chair of Energy Engineering, Queen Mary, University of London; former James Watt Professor at the University of Glasgow, Scotland; former Mechanical Engineering Professor at Washington University in St. Louis
Joseph E. Aoun (PhD 1982) – president of Northeastern University, linguist, author
Andrew Armacost (M.S. 1995, PhD 2000) – dean of the United States Air Force Academy
Dennis Assanis (M.S. in Naval Architecture and Marine Engineering 1983, M.S. in Mechanical Engineering 1983, M.S. in Management 1986, PhD in Power and Propulsion 1986) – former Jon R. and Beverly S. Holt Professor and Arthur F. Thurnau Professor at the University of Michigan; Provost and Senior VP for Academic Affairs at Stony Brook University
Larry Bacow (B.S. 1972) – president of Harvard University, former president of Tufts University, lawyer, economist, author
Merrill J. Bateman (PhD 1965) – former president of Brigham Young University; Mormon Presiding Bishop
Scott C. Beardsley – dean of the University of Virginia Darden School of Business
Lawrence Berk (B.S. Architectural Engineering 1932) – founder and former president of Berklee College of Music (1945–1978)
William R. Brody (B.S. 1965, M.S. 1966) – former president of Johns Hopkins University, current president of Salk Institute
Emily Calandrelli (M.S. 2013) – aerospace engineer and STEM communicator
Marion Hamilton Carter (1893) – educator, journalist, author
Jared Cohon (M.S. 1972, PhD 1973) – former president of Carnegie Mellon University
William Cooper (PhD 1976) – president of University of Richmond
Dianna Leilani Cowern (2011) – physics alumnus and STEM educator and communicator on YouTube and elsewhere as a YouTuber and similar as “Physics Girl” collaborating often with fellow MIT graduate Emily Calandrelli and many other people associated with many other organizations
Allan Cullimore – former president of New Jersey Institute of Technology (1920–1947)
Laura D'Andrea Tyson (PhD 1974) – chairman of the CEA under Clinton; former dean of the Haas School of Business; former dean of the London Business School
Woodie Flowers (M.S. 1968, ME 1971, PhD 1973) – MIT professor, created Introduction to Design (2.70), founder of FIRST Robotics Competition, starting host of Scientific American Frontiers (1990–93)
Philip Friedman (PhD 1972) – president of Golden Gate University
David Garrison – founding chair, University of Houston–Clear Lake Physics Department
Thomas P. Gerrity – former dean of Wharton School at the University of Pennsylvania
Hollis Godfrey (1889) – former president of Drexel University
Eric Grimson (PhD Mathematics 1980) – computer scientist and Chancellor of MIT
Amos Horev (B.S., M.S.) – former president of Technion
Shirley Jackson (B.S. 1968, PhD 1973) – president of Rensselaer Polytechnic Institute, physicist
Martin C. Jischke (M.S., PhD 1968) – former president of Purdue University
Theodora J. Kalikow (Sc.M. 1970) – former president of the University of Maine at Farmington and the University of Southern Maine
Salman Khan – founder and executive director of Khan Academy
Joseph Klafter – chemical physics professor, the eighth President of Tel Aviv University
Martin C. Libicki (B.S. Mathematics) – professor at the Frederick S. Pardee RAND Graduate School in Santa Monica, California
John Maeda (B.S., M.S. 1989) – former president of Rhode Island School of Design (2008–2013), graphic designer, computer scientist, author, venture capitalist
Modesto Maidique (B.S. 1962, M.S. 1964, EE 1966, PhD 1970) – former president of Florida International University
Julianne Malveaux (PhD 1980) – president of Bennett College
Alan Marcus (PhD 1981) – economist; professor at the Carroll School of Management, Boston College. The first recipient of the Mario Gabelli Endowed Professorship.
David McClain (PhD 1974) – president of University of Hawaii
Frederic Mishkin (B.S. 1973, PhD 1976) – economist; professor at Columbia Business School; Board of Governors of the Federal Reserve System (2006–2008); appeared in the documentary Inside Job
Leo E. Morton (M.S. 1987) – chancellor of University of Missouri-Kansas City
Gretchen Ritter (Ph.D.) – dean of the Cornell University College of Arts and Sciences.
Richard Santagati (M.S. 1979) – former president of Merrimack College
Rahmat Shoureshi – researcher, professor, and provost of New York Institute of Technology (NYIT)
Reed Shuldiner (Ph.D. 1985) – Alvin L. Snowiss Professor of Law at the University of Pennsylvania Law School
Nam-Pyo Suh (B.S. 1959, M.S. 1961) – president of KAIST (Korea Advanced Institute of Science and Technology)
Lawrence H. Summers (B.S. 1975) – former president of Harvard University, economist, former presidential advisor
Subra Suresh (ScD 1981) – former president of Carnegie Mellon University, former Director of the National Science Foundation, former Dean of the School of Engineering at MIT
 Demetri Terzopoulos  (PhD 1984) - Academy Award winning computer scientist, university professor, author, and entrepreneur
 Ahmed Tewfik (PhD 1987) – IEEE Signal Processing Society President, former chair of the Department of Electrical and Computer Engineering at the Cockrell School of Engineering at the University of Texas at Austin
Lee T. Todd, Jr. (M.S. 1970, EE 1971, PhD 1974) – president of University of Kentucky
Hal Varian (B.S. 1969) – chief economist at Google, founding dean of the School of Information at UC Berkeley
Patrick Henry Winston (B.S. 1965, M.S. 1967, PhD 1970) – author of standard textbooks on artificial intelligence and programming languages, MIT professor, co-founded Ascent Technology
Elisabeth Zinser (M.S. 1982) – president of Southern Oregon University
Muhammad M. Al-Saggaf (M.S. 1996, PhD 2000 in Geophysics) - President of King Fahd University of Petroleum and Minerals

Humanities, arts, and social sciences

Academics 

 Saleem Ali (PhD 2001) – Blue and Gold Distinguished Professor of Energy and Environment at the University of Delaware, National Geographic Emerging Explorer, World Economic Forum Young Global Leader
Harry Binswanger – philosopher, associate of Ayn Rand
Michael Brame (PhD 1970) – professor of linguistics at the University of Washington
Dan Massey – sexual freedom scholar, religious philosopher, human rights activist, chief engineer at BBN Technologies, and senior scientist at Science Applications International Corporation
Charles Murray (M.S.; PhD Political Science 1974) – researcher, co-author of The Bell Curve  - professor of Management Science and Engineering at Stanford University
Ellen Swallow Richards (B.S. 1873) – founder of the modern home economics discipline and first woman admitted to MIT

Actors, Directors, and other crew 
Dylan Bruno – actor; former model
Yau-Man Chan (B.S. 1974) – contestant on Survivor: Figi and Survivor: Micronesia; table tennis player
James Eckhouse (1976, dropped out) – actor, Beverly Hills, 90210
Herbert Kalmus (1903) – inventor of Technicolor; star on the Hollywood Walk of Fame
Erland Van Lidth De Jeude – Hollywood actor; opera singer
James Woods (1969, dropped out) – Hollywood actor; Oscar nominee; Emmy winner
Dottie Zicklin (1986) – television writer and producer; co-creator of the sitcoms Caroline in the City, Dharma & Greg, and Are You There, Chelsea?

Economists, correspondents, and political advisors 

Nariman Behravesh (born 1948), economist
 Dean Karlan (PhD Development Economics and Public Finance 2002) – development economist and founder of Innovations for Poverty Action
Paul Krugman (PhD) – New York Times columnist, John Bates Clark Medal and Nobel Prize winner (economics)
 Robert J. Shiller (born 1946), Nobel-Prize winning economist, academic, and author
David Walter – British BBC and ITN correspondent and later, political advisor (winner of Kennedy Memorial Scholarship to MIT)

Musicians, Record Producers, and Engineers 
Nate Greenslit (PhD) – musician, writer and academic
Ned Lagin – played keyboards and synthesizer at a number of the Grateful Dead shows between 1970 and 1975 and on a few mid–1970s albums
Rajesh Mehta (B.S. Humanities and Engineering 1986) – hybrid trumpeter, composer, educational technology consultant
Alan Pierson (B.S. Music, Physics, 1996-1997) – American conductor; Northwester University faculty
Tom Scott (B.S. 1966) – winner of two Academy Awards for Best Sound for The Right Stuff and Amadeus
 Jamshied Sharifi – Tony Award winning composer

Painting, Sculpting, and visual art 
Alia Farid – contemporary artist
Marisa Morán Jahn (M.S.) – multimedia artist and founder of Studio REV-
 Alan Rath (B.S. 1982) – electronic, kinetic, and robotic sculptor
Samuel Washington Weis – painter

Writers and Editors 

 Steve Altes (B.S. 1984, M.S. 1986) – humorist, National Medal of Technology recipient, writer of Geeks & Greeks graphic novel about MIT
 John W. Campbell (physics, dropped out) – writer, longtime editor of Astounding Science Fiction
 Rebecca Richardson Joslin – essayist, lecturer, benefactor, clubwoman
 Kealoha, born Steven Wong (1999) – performance poet; Hawaii's first Poet Laureate and National Poetry Slam Legend; storyteller; Hawaii's SlamMaster
 Hugh Lofting – author of Dr. Dolittle series of books; trained at MIT as civil engineer, 1904–05
John Shelton Reed (B.S. 1964) – sociologist, author of The Enduring South, elected to the Fellowship of Southern Writers

Science and technology

Colin Adams – mathematician, knot theory expert, teacher, writer, math humorist
 Rakesh Agrawal – National Medal of Technology and Innovation Laureate and Professor of Chemical Engineering at Purdue University
John George Trump - electrical engineer, inventor, and physicist, then become a professor of MIT from 1936 until 1973, direct the MIT High Voltage Research Laboratory from 1946 to 1980
Buzz Aldrin – combat pilot, astronaut, second man to walk on the Moon
Pauline Morrow Austin – meteorologist, Director of Weather Radar at MIT, research staff in Radiation Laboratory
Adrian Bejan – professor of mechanical engineering, namesake of the Bejan number
Gordon Bell – computer engineer and manager, designer of DEC PDP, manager of the VAX project
Stephen Benton – invented rainbow hologram, pioneered digital holography
Manuel Blum – computer scientist, received Turing Award (1995) for studies in computational complexity theory
Katie Bouman – computer game designer and programmer, developed Zork adventure game
Katie Bouman – computer scientist and electrical engineer involved in developing the algorithm used in filtering the first images of a black hole taken by the Event Horizon Telescope
Dan Bricklin – co-inventor of Visicalc, the first WYSIWYG PC spreadsheet program
Alice G. Bryant – otolaryngologist and inventor of surgical tools
Edward M. Burgess – chemist, inventor of the Burgess reagent
Christopher Chen – William Fairfield Warren Distinguished Professor of Biomedical Engineering at Boston University.
David D. Clark – led the development of TCP/IP (the protocol that underlies the Internet)
Wesley A. Clark – computing pioneer, creator of the LINC (the first minicomputer)
Fernando Corbató – retired MIT professor, Turing Award (1990), co-founder of the Multics project
Shiladitya DasSarma (PhD 1985) – pioneering microbiologist and professor at University of Maryland School of Medicine who deciphered genetic code for Halobacterium NRC-1
Peter J. Denning (M.S. 1965, PhD 1968) – computer scientist, professor, co-founder of the Multics project, pioneered virtual memory
Jack Dennis – retired MIT professor, co-founder of the Multics project
Peter Diamandis – founder and chairman of the X PRIZE Foundation, co-founder and chairman of Singularity University, and co-author of New York Times bestseller Abundance: The Future Is Better Than You Think
Whitfield Diffie – pioneer of public-key cryptography and the Diffie-Hellman protocol, Turing Award (2015)
K. Eric Drexler – pioneer nanotechnologist, author, co-founded Foresight Institute
Harold Eugene "Doc" Edgerton (M.S. 1927, ScD 1931) – former MIT Institute professor; co-founder, and the "E", of EG&G; stroboscope photography pioneer; Oscar winner 1940
Theodore Miller Edison (1898–1992) – only child of Thomas Alva Edison who graduated from college; inventor with over 80 patents
Farouk El-Baz – Supervisor of Lunar Science Planning, Apollo Program, NASA
Kelly Falkner (PhD 1989) – oceanographer, Antarctic researcher
Bran Ferren (Class of 1974) – Designer, Technologist, Engineer, entertainment technology expert, prolific inventor, Academy Award nominee
Carl Feynman – computer scientist; son of the physicist Richard Feynman
Mike Fincke (B.S. Aero/Astro 1989, SB EAPS 1989) – NASA astronaut.
Marron William Fort (B.S. 1926, M.S. 1927, PhD 1933) – first African-American to earn a PhD in engineering
Bob Frankston (B.S. 1970, M.S. EE 1974) – co-inventor of Visicalc (first WYSIWYG PC spreadsheet program); critic of telecommunications public policy
Limor Fried – open-source hardware pioneer, founder of Adafruit Industries
Simson Garfinkel – journalist, author, computer security researcher, entrepreneur, computer science professor
Ivan Getting – co-inventor of the Global Positioning System (GPS), Draper Prize (2003)
Jim Gettys – an original developer of X Window, former director of GNOME
Martha Goodway – archaeometallurgist at the Smithsonian Institution
Bill Gosper (B.S. 1965) – mathematician, a founder of the original hacker community, pioneer of symbolic computing, originator of hashlife
Julia R. Greer (B.S. 1997) – materials science professor at Caltech, pioneer in the fields of nanomechanics and architected materials, CNN 2020 Visionary
Gerald Guralnik (B.S. 1958) – Professor of Physics, Brown University; co-discoverer of Higgs mechanism and Higgs boson in 1964 with C.R. Hagen; awarded J. J. Sakurai Prize for Theoretical Particle Physics in 2010
C. R. Hagen (B.S., M.S. 1958, PhD. 1963) – Professor of Physics, University of Rochester; co-discoverer of Higgs mechanism and Higgs boson in 1964 with Gerald Guralnik; awarded J. J. Sakurai Prize for Theoretical Particle Physics in (2010) 
George Ellery Hale – astronomer, founded several astronomical observatories, developed Throop College of Technology into Caltech
Heidi Hammel (B.S. 1982) – planetary astronomer who has extensively studied Neptune and Uranus.
Karen Hao (B.S. 2015), award-winning AI journalist
 William W. Happ (M.S.) – Silicon transistor pioneer at Shockley Semiconductor Laboratory, and Professor at Arizona State University.
 Guadalupe Hayes-Mota – (B.S. 2008, M.S. 2016, MBA 2016) - biotechnologist and business director.
Asegun Henry (M.S., PhD 2009) – mechanical engineer
 Caroline Herzenberg (B.S. 1953) – physicist
Julian W. Hill (PhD 1928) – inventor of nylon
C.-T. James Huang (PhD 1982) – generative linguist, Professor and Director of Graduate Studies at Harvard, Fellow of the Linguistic Society of America (2015), recipient of the Linguistic Society of Taiwan's Lifetime Achievement Award (2014)
David A. Huffman – computer scientist known for Huffman coding used in lossless data compression
Jerome C. Hunsaker (M.S. 1912, ScD 1923) – pioneering aeronautical engineer, airship designer, former head of MIT Mechanical Engineering Department
Anya Hurlbert (PhD, 1989) – visual neuroscientist
William Jeffrey – defense technology expert, former director of National Institute of Standards and Technology
Thomas Kailath – entrepreneur, retired Stanford professor, IEEE Medal of Honor (2007)
Rudolf E. Kálmán – electrical engineer, theoretical mathematician, co-inventor of Kalman Filter algorithm, Draper Prize (2008)
Jordin Kare – high energy laser physicist, developer of "mosquito laser zapper"
Gregor Kiczales – computer scientist, professor at the University of British Columbia, Fellow of the Association for Computing Machinery
Leonard Kleinrock (M.S. Electrical Engineering 1959, PhD Computer Science 1963) – computing and Internet pioneer, one of the key group of designers of the original ARPANET
Henry Kloss (1953, dropped out) – audio engineer; entrepreneur; founder of Acoustic Research, KLH, Advent, Kloss Video, Cambridge SoundWorks, Tivoli Audio
Loren Kohnfelder – introduced the term "public key certificate" for public key cryptography in secure network communication
Raymond Kurzweil (B.S. 1970) – inventor, entrepreneur in music synthesizers, OCR and speech-to-text processing
Leslie Lamport (B.S. 1960) – computing pioneer in temporal logic, developer of LaTeX, winner of the Turing Award (2013)
Robert S. Langer – biochemical engineer, biomedical researcher, MIT professor, inventor, entrepreneur, Draper Prize (2002)
Norman Levinson (B.S., M.S. 1934, ScD 1935) – theoretical mathematician, former Institute Professor at MIT, developed Levinson recursion
Daniel Levitin – neuroscientist, music producer, author of This Is Your Brain on Music
Soung Chang Liew (B.S. 1984, M.S. 1986, PhD 1988) – information engineering professor
Steven R. Little (PhD 2005) – chemical engineer, pharmaceutical scientist, and department chair of Chemical Engineering at the University of Pittsburgh Swanson School of Engineering
Maureen D. Long (PhD 2006) – observational seismologist
Edward Norton Lorenz – mathematician, meteorologist, MIT professor emeritus, invented chaos theory, discovered Lorenz attractor
Joseph Lykken (PhD 1982) – theoretical physicist, proposed "weak scale superstring" theory
Danilo M Maceda Jr – technology policy expert, software entrepreneur, film writer, software engineer, computer programmer (dropout for hacking CIA server)
Hiram Percy Maxim – inventor of the "Maxim Silencer" and founder of the American Radio Relay League
John F. McCarthy Jr. (B.S. 1950, M.S. 1951) – director of MIT Center for Space Research and director of Lewis Research Center, NASA
Douglas McIlroy (PhD 1959) – mathematician, software engineer, professor, developed component-based software engineering, an original developer of Unix, member of National Academy of Engineering
Diane McKnight (B.S. 1975, M.S. 1978, PhD 1979) – engineering professor, limnologist, biogeochemist, Antarctic researcher
Anne McNeil (Postdoc 2005–2007) – chemist and professor at University of Michigan
Faye McNeill (PhD 2005) – American atmospheric chemist and Professor of Chemical Engineering at Columbia University
Parisa Mehrkhodavandi (PhD 2002) – chemist
Fulvio Melia (PhD 1985) – theoretical astrophysicist, professor, author, editor, general educator
Holly Michael, (PhD 2005) – hydrogeologist and professor
Arnold Mindell (MSc 1961) – physicist, author, psychologist – developer of Process Oriented Psychology
Daniel Mindiola – professor of chemistry at University of Pennsylvania
Douglas J. Mink (B.S. 1973, M.S. 1974) – astronomer, software developer, co-discovered rings around Uranus, bicycling activist
Bill Parker – artist, engineer, inventor of the modern plasma lamp
Bradford Parkinson – co-inventor of the Global Positioning System (GPS), Draper Prize (2003)
Robert A. "Bob" Pease (B.S. 1961) – analog integrated circuit design expert, technical author
Irene Pepperberg (B.S. 1969) – Brandeis University professor, researcher in animal cognition, trained Alex (parrot)
Alan Perlis (M.S. 1949, PhD 1950) – computer scientist, professor, pioneer of programming languages, winner of the first Turing Award (1966)
Radia Perlman (B.S. 1973, M.S. 1976, PhD 1988) – computer scientist, network engineer, invented numerous data network technologies, "mother of the Internet"
David Pesetsky (PhD 1982) – generative linguist, Ferrari P. Ward Professor of Modern Languages and Linguistics and Head of the Department of Linguistics and Philosophy at the MIT
Edward Rebar (PhD 1997) – biologist, senior vice president, and chief technology officer at Sangamo Therapeutics
ChoKyun Rha (B.S. 1962, M.S. 1964, M.S. 1966, SCD 1967) – food technologist, professor at MIT
Adam Riess (B.S. 1992) – physicist, Nobel Prize winner in Physics awarded in 2011 for demonstrating the acceleration of the universe's rate of expansion
Louis W. Roberts (PhD 1946) – microwave physicist, chief of the Microwave Laboratory at NASA's Electronics Research Center, director of the John A. Volpe National Transportation Systems Center
Jerome Saltzer – retired MIT professor, timesharing computing pioneer, co-founder of the Multics project, Director of Project Athena
Frederick P. Salvucci (B.S. 1961, M.S. 1962) – civil engineer, transportation planner, MIT professor, former Massachusetts Secretary of Transportation, public transit advocate, Big Dig advocate
George W. Santos – pioneer in bone marrow transplantation
Bob Scheifler – computer scientist, leader of the X Window System project, architect of Jini
Julie Segre – epithelial biologist, Chief of the Human Genome Research Institute
Oliver Selfridge – computer scientist, father of machine perception
Claude Shannon – mathematician, electrical engineer, and cryptographer known as "the father of information theory"
Amy B. Smith (B.S. 1984, M.S. 1995) – mechanical engineer, inventor, former Peace Corps volunteer, MIT senior lecturer and researcher in appropriate technology, MacArthur Fellow (2004)
Oliver R. Smoot – namesake of the smoot unit of measurement, former chair of ANSI; former president of ISO
Richard M. Stallman (grad student, dropped out) – computer programmer; Free Software activist; creator of EMACS editor, GNU; MacArthur Fellow (1990)
Guy L. Steele, Jr. (M.S. 1977, PhD 1980) – computer scientist, programming language expert, an original editor of the Jargon File (Hacker's Dictionary)
Richard Stratt (B.S. 1975) – professor of physical chemistry at Brown University
Mahmooda Sultana (PhD 2010) – NASA research engineer
Bert Sutherland (M.S., PhD) – managed research laboratories, including Sun Microsystems Laboratories (1992–1998), the Systems Science Laboratory at Xerox PARC (1975–1981), and the Computer Science Division of Bolt, Beranek and Newman
Ivan Sutherland (PhD 1963) – computer graphics pioneer, former professor, ARPAnet and Internet pioneer, co-founded Evans & Sutherland, Turing Award (1988)
Lynne Talley (PhD 1982) – physical oceanographer, professor
Badri Nath Tandon (1961) – gastroenterologist, textbook author, Sasakawa WHO Health Prize and Padma Bhushan winner
Andrew S. Tanenbaum (B.S. 1965) – computer scientist, professor, textbook author (operating systems), creator of Minix (the precursor to Linux)
Frederick Terman – electrical engineer; former provost of Stanford University; "father of Silicon Valley"
Ray Tomlinson – innovator of email systems, pioneered the use of the "@" symbol for email
Leonard H. Tower Jr. (B.S. Biology 1971) – early Free Software activist, software hacker
John G. Trump – electrical engineer, inventor, and physicist
Kay Tye – neuroscientist, MIT assistant professor
Denisa Wagner – vascular biologist at Harvard Medical School
Ann M. Valentine – chemist, professor at Yale and Temple University
Manuel Sandoval Vallarta – MIT professor, founder of the Physics Institute at UNAM; mentor of Nobel laureate Richard Feynman
Susie Wee – Women in Technology International laureate; CTEO of Collaboration at Cisco
Robert Williams Wood – optical physicist, developed "black light", ultraviolet and infrared photography
Joshua Wurman – meteorologist, inventor, developed the Doppler On Wheels, Bistatic Weather Radar Networks, founder and president of Center for Severe Weather Research (CSWR)
Jenny Y Yang (PhD 2007) – chemist
Edward Yourdon – computer pioneer, author, lecturer, popularized the term "Y2K Bug"
Gregorio Y. Zara – inventor of the first two-way videophone; National Scientist of the Philippines
Günter M. Ziegler – mathematician, Free University of Berlin professor, ex-president of the German Mathematical Society, recipient of the Chauvenet and Leroy P. Steele prizes

Sports

Jimmy Bartolotta (2009) – professional basketball player
Charles Butt, Jr. (1941) – rowing coach 
Skip Dise (2003) – member of 2010 US National Rowing Team
Adam Edelman (2014) – American-born Israeli Olympic skeleton athlete
Johan Harmenberg (dropped out circa 1975-1977; drafted by Sweden) – épée fencer, gold medal winner in the 1980 Olympics, world champion
Larry Kahn – tiddlywinks champion
Dave Lockwood (1975) – tiddlywinks champion
Jeff Sagarin (1970) – sports statistician
Zeke Sanborn – Olympic gold medalist
Jason Szuminski (2000) – major league pitcher
Steve Tucker (1991) – two-time member of the US Olympic rowing team

Miscellaneous

Katy Croff Bell (B.S. Ocean Engineering 2000) – National Geographic explorer
Sylvester Q. Cannon (B.S. Mining Engineering) – Apostle of The Church of Jesus Christ of Latter-Day Saints
Csaba Csere (1978 B.S., 2 Mechanical Engineering) – automotive journalist, editor of Car and Driver
Janet Hsieh (2001) – Taiwanese-American television personality, violinist, author, and model; host of Fun Taiwan
Jeff Hwang – US Air Force fighter pilot, 1999 winner of Mackay Trophy
J. Kenji López-Alt (2002 B.S., 4, Architecture) – celebrity chef, author of The Food Lab: Better Home Cooking Through Science
Ray Magliozzi (1972 B.S., 21B, Humanities and Science) – radio personality, Car Talk
Tom Magliozzi (1958 B.S., 14A, Economic Policy and Engineering) – radio personality, Car Talk
Lalit Pande (1972 M.S., 2 Mechanical Engineering) – environmentalist and Padma Shri awardee
London Akira Mizuno (2000 B.S. Electrical engineer)
Randal Pinkett – chairman and CEO of BCT Partners; winner of television show The Apprentice
Ubol Ratana (1973 B.S., 18 Mathematics) – Princess of Thailand 
Aafia Siddiqui (1995 B.S., 7 Biology / Life Science) – neuroscientist; alleged Al-Qaeda operative; convicted of assaulting with a deadly weapon and attempting to kill US soldiers and FBI agents
Ellen Spertus (1990 B.S., 1992 M.S., 1998 PhD, Computer Science) – professor, computer scientist, 2001's "Sexiest Geek Alive"
Kelvin Teo (M.S. 2006) – young entrepreneur and season 1 winner of Malaysian reality show Love Me Do
Robert Varkonyi (1983 B.S., 15 Management, 1983 SB, 6 Computer Science and Engineering) – winner of the 2002 World Series of Poker Main Event

Fictional
Lex Luthor, diabolical genius and supervillain of the DC Universe
Tim McGee, field agent specializing in cybersecurity and computer crime on NCIS, portrayed by Sean Murray
Tony Stark, alter ego of Iron Man, portrayed by Robert Downey Jr. in the Marvel Cinematic Universe films
Howard Wolowitz, character on The Big Bang Theory, portrayed by Simon Helberg
Gordon Freeman, the silent protagonist of Half-Life (series), graduated at MIT with a Ph.D. degree in Theoretical Physics

Nobel laureate alumni
, the MIT Office of the Provost says that 76 Nobel awardees had or currently have a formal connection to MIT. Of this group, 29 have earned MIT degrees (MIT has never awarded honorary degrees in any form).

Astronaut alumni

See also 
 List of companies founded by MIT alumni

References

Lists of people by university or college in Massachusetts